The Record is the debut studio album by the American hardcore punk band Fear, released May 16, 1982, by Slash Records. It was produced by Gary Lubow. The album was reissued on CD in 2007 with the single "Fuck Christmas" as a bonus track. The band re-recorded the album in its entirety and released it under the title The Fear Record in 2012.

Reception 

The album has been regarded as Fear's best album and as a classic album of the 1980s Los Angeles hardcore punk scene. It has received mostly positive reviews, with Mark Deming of AllMusic rating the album 4.5 out of 5 stars and stating that it "makes sense that John Belushi was a big fan of Fear, because The Record sounds like the punk equivalent of the movie Animal House -- puerile, offensive, and often reveling in its own ignorance, but pretty entertaining on a non-think level while it lasts". He also stated that Fear had a "fairly unique perspective -- they seemingly embraced punk as an efficient way to piss off everyone around them, and there's no arguing that they achieved their goals with flying colors on their first and best album, The Record". Record Collectors Mark Rigby called it "probably the most exciting and impressive, one-dimensional, ill-mannered, distasteful, odious 'hate' record ever made".

Legacy 
Kurt Cobain listed it in his top 50 albums of all time.

Vocalist/rhythm guitarist Lee Ving was interviewed about the original album's recording in Dave Grohl's 2013 documentary film Sound City.

Guns N' Roses bassist Duff McKagan picked the song "We Destroy the Family" for his 2016 list "The 10 Best Punk Songs" and said, "Fear's debut album The Record still gets played backstage before I go on".

"Let's Have a War" was included on the Repo Man soundtrack album and covered by A Perfect Circle on the album eMOTIVe.  It was also covered by Course of Empire on the Infested EP.

Track listing

The Fear Record 

In June 2012, a new lineup of Fear re-recorded The Record in its entirety. With a slightly altered track sequence, it was released by The End Records on November 6, 2012. Due to the sexism of songs such as "Beef Boloney" and the homophobia of the song "New York's Alright If You Like Saxophones", certain lyrics were altered for the remakes. The re-recorded album received mostly negative reviews from critics and fans alike. Jason Lymangrover of AllMusic rated it 2.5 out of 5 stars and stated: "The reason why this was made is a complete mystery. The '80s version is obviously the way to go. It's a perfect snapshot of the snottiest band of the punk movement baiting everyone and everything around them". He also said that "finances played into the band disbanding before, so there is a good chance that this version was devised as a way to cash in. Even if the reasons are more innocent, and Ving believed that his time spent playing the guitar parts live for three decades would help him update his masterpiece, times have changed".

Track listing

Personnel

Original version 
 Lee Ving – lead vocals, rhythm guitar, bass on "New York's Alright If You Like Saxophones"
 Philo Cramer – lead guitar, backing vocals
 Derf Scratch – bass, backing vocals, saxophone, rhythm guitar on "New York's Alright If You Like Saxophones", lead vocals on "Getting the Brush"
 Spit Stix – drums

Production
 Gary Lubow – producer
 Bruce Barris – engineer
 Geza X – mixing
 Greg Lee – mastering
 Barbara Biro Ving – photography

Re-recording 
 Lee Ving – lead vocals, rhythm guitar
 Dave Stark – lead guitar, backing vocals
 Paul Lerma – bass, backing vocals
 Andrew Jaimez – drums

Additional performers
 David Urquitti – saxophone on "New York's Alright If You Like Saxophones"

Production
 Fear – producers
 John Lousteau, Andrew Jamiez – engineers
 Bill Stevenson – mixing
 Jason Livermore – mastering
 Cynthia Correl – photography

Album notes 
 The Fender Precision Bass used by Derf Scratch on the original album was sold to Mike Watt of the Minutemen and was later used on the Minutemen's second album, What Makes a Man Start Fires?.
 "I Love Livin' in the City", from the original album, was featured in the video games The Warriors and Tony Hawk's Underground 2, and on the soundtrack for the film SLC Punk!

References 

1982 debut albums
Fear (band) albums
Slash Records albums
Albums recorded at Sound City Studios